Stefan Kozlov was the defending champion but lost in the second round to Lucas Gerch.

Ben Shelton won the title after defeating Christopher Eubanks 7–6(7–4), 7–5 in the final.

Seeds

Draw

Finals

Top half

Bottom half

References

External links
Main draw
Qualifying draw

Charlottesville Men's Pro Challenger - 1
2022 Singles